The Billboard Music Award winners for Top Male Rap Artist (2018–present).

Winners and Nominees (2018-present)

References

Billboard Music Award